Calais Conference may refer to:

Calais Conference (July 1915)
Calais Conference (December 1915)
Calais Conference (1917)